William Bertrand Goldsboro (August 30, 1884 – May 1, 1937) was a track and field athlete who competed in the 1908 Summer Olympics for Canada. He finished 16th in the Men's Marathon. He was affiliated with Central YMCA in Toronto.

References

External links
William Goldsbro's profile at Sports Reference.com

1884 births
1937 deaths
Canadian male marathon runners
Olympic track and field athletes of Canada
Athletes (track and field) at the 1908 Summer Olympics
Athletes from Toronto